Cabum, born Frank Kwame Gyasi- Frimpong on 15 June 1985, to Ghanaian highlife musician Alhaji Kwame Frimpong (popularly known as Alhaji K. Frimpong) and Joyce Asabia Frimpong, is a Ghanaian rapper from Kumasi.

Career 
After two years of work, he got signed to Rock Entertainment and worked with a few managers including Andy Kem and Yaw Sarpong-Kumankuma. He has since released his first studio album "The Beginning".
His slogan or emblem which literally means "Cherish it" normally precedes or ends all his records. He uses that slogan to usher his listeners into his music to cherish his lyrics. Cabum has since shared the stage with Angelique Kidjo and Youssou Ndour at the Mo Ibrahim Freedom Concert.

Nominations

Ghana Music Awards 

|-
|rowspan="1"|2016
|rowspan="1"|Aka Blay ft Cabum
|Highlife Song of the Year
|
|-
|rowspan="1"|2017
|rowspan="1"| Okyeame Kwame ft. Cabum, Medikal, Sister Derby,
|HIP-HOP SONG OF THE YEAR.
|
|}

Discography

Studio albums 
The Beginning

Singles 
"Dodoodo"
"Atingya"
"Style Bea be"
"Devile in my temple"
"To be a man"

References

External links 
AJ Nelson - Innuendo (Prod. by Cabum)
Cabum disses Sarkodie And M.anifest
Watch Koo Ntakra, Cabum and Eno's performance at Bar 3 Concert
Cabum professes his love for Yvonne Nelson – Citi Showbiz
"I can see Reggie Rockstone just want attention" - Cabum

Living people
Ghanaian rappers
People from Kumasi
1985 births
Musicians from Kumasi